The Personal Memoirs of U. S. Grant are two volumes of autobiography by Ulysses S. Grant, the 18th President of the United States. The work focuses on his military career during the Mexican–American War and the American Civil War. The volumes were written during the last year of Grant's life, amid increasing pain from terminal throat cancer and against the backdrop of his personal bankruptcy at the hands of an early Ponzi scheme. The set was published by Mark Twain shortly after Grant's death in July 1885.

Twain was a close personal friend of Grant and used all of his famous talent for promotion in selling the books. Understanding that sales of the book would restore the Grant family's finances and provide for his widow, Twain created a unique marketing system designed to reach millions of veterans with a patriotic appeal just as the famous general's death was being mourned. Ten thousand agents canvassed the North for orders, following a script that Twain had devised. Many were Union veterans dressed in their old uniforms, who went door-to-door offering the two-volume set at prices ranging from $3.50 to $12, depending on the binding ($ to $ in ).

These efforts sold 350,000 two-volume sets in advance of the book's actual printing. This made the Memoirs one of the bestselling books of the 19th century, in its first year even outselling the publishing behemoth Uncle Tom's Cabin—an extremely unusual result for a non-fiction book. By way of comparison, the memoirs of Grant's colleague William Tecumseh Sherman, published in 1876, were an immense financial success for their author, selling 25,000 copies during its first decade in print. In the end Grant's widow, Julia, received about $450,000 ($ in ) from Twain during the first three years of publication, suggesting that Grant received around 30% of each sale (i.e., a 30% royalty rate).

Despite being explicitly written for money, and with a focus on those aspects of Grant's life most likely to induce sales, the Personal Memoirs of U. S. Grant received universal acclaim on their publication and have remained highly regarded by the general public, military historians, and literary critics. The combination of an honest man exploited and then marked for death by throat cancer lent the Memoirs immense contemporary interest. Positive attention is often directed toward Grant's prose, which has been praised as lean, intelligent and effective. He candidly depicts his battles against both the Confederates and his internal Army foes.

Background

World tour and money troubles 
Grant and his wife Julia took a trip around the world in 1877 after his second term in office. Personally financed, this tour left him short on liquid assets on his return. He was nearly 60 and he looked for something to engage his time and replenish his finances. In 1878, he moved to New York City and entered into business with his son Buck (Ulysses S. Grant, Jr.) and Ferdinand Ward. Ward was a young investor and personal friend of the junior Grant. Ward was described by his great-grandson Geoffrey Ward as "a very plausible, charming, unobtrusive, slender person with a genius for finding older people and pleasing them, which he learned early on."

Ponzi scheme, personal bankruptcy and cancer diagnosis 
The firm of Grant & Ward did well at first, bolstered by Ward's skills and Grant's name. The former president bragged to friends that he was worth two and a half million dollars, and family members and friends poured money into the firm. But Grant was largely disengaged from the company's business, often signing papers without reading them. This proved disastrous, as Ward had used the firm as a Ponzi scheme, taking investors' money and spending it on personal items, including a mansion in Connecticut and a brownstone in New York City. Grant & Ward failed in May 1884, leaving Grant penniless. That fall, the elder Grant was diagnosed with terminal throat cancer.

Century Company publishing deal 
Long before his diagnosis Grant had written a series of articles analyzing many of the battles he had overseen. These articles had been published by The Century Company in their flagship periodical, Century Magazine. Century had paid Grant a flat author's fee of $500 (more than $ in 2022) per article. The essays were well received by critics and in 1876 the editor of Century Magazine, Robert Underwood Johnson, suggested Grant expand them into a memoir, as William Tecumseh Sherman had recently done to great acclaim. Now facing his own mortality and the prospect of his family's destitution after his death, Grant approached Century with a proposal to publish his personal memoirs, serially and then in bound volumes. Century agreed to publish the work and drew up a contract in which the dying man would receive 10% of every sale of the book.

Mark Twain intervenes 
Grant's personal friend Mark Twain soon heard news of this publishing deal and was unable to conceal his horror at how little money Grant stood to earn if he agreed to Century's terms. Twain dropped everything and rushed to New York City from his home in Hartford, Connecticut. When Twain entered the Grant home on 66th St. he noticed Grant's eldest son, Frederick reviewing the Century contract one final time before his father signed it. Twain recalled that Grant was on the point of picking up his pen as the novelist arrived.

Twain intervened in the signing and asked to read the contract himself. After finishing his review Twain declared the term giving Grant 10% of all sales was insultingly low and amounted to exploitation of the former president's dire situation. Twain insisted that he could secure a far more favorable publishing contract for Grant and pressed him for his proxy in new negotiations. Grant felt a personal loyalty to the executives of Century, and considered it dishonorable to back out of his contract after all details had been agreed upon and papers drawn up. Twain grew exasperated and confessed that he himself had far better terms from his own publisher, the American Publishing Company.

Twain's proposal 
The key element in Mark Twain's proposal to Grant was publication through a subscription scheme. Twain himself was preparing to publish his own Adventures of Huckleberry Finn through a subscription plan. This involved door-to-door salesmen (often Civil War veterans) who collected upfront fees by which the eventual publication would be financed. Without a publisher's capital in play to cover printing and distribution, subscription gave the author far more power in determining their eventual share of sales. Further, under a subscription scheme, tens of thousands of dollars would be generated before the finished book was even bound. Twain was famously persuasive and this upfront cash was a powerful inducement to a man in Grant's situation, however it was only after Frederick suggested the present contract be set aside for 24 hours, until the facts of Twain's claims could be investigated, that his father agreed to sign no documents that day.

Knowing the former general's reputation for stubbornness, Twain privately fretted that 24 hours would not be enough time to convince Grant to change his mind. In the end it was Grant's sense of honor, coupled with his fear the memoirs would prove a flop, that persuaded him to accept Twain's plan: Twain had recommended Charles Webster Publishing, a new house run by his wife's nephew and largely capitalized by Twain himself. A subscription would not require Grant to put the money Twain had invested in Charles Webster at risk to publish his memoirs, as the capital necessary for publication and distribution would have been generated by subscription prior to printing. Such was Twain's faith in Grant's prose and the national interest in his thoughts that he gave Grant a sizeable advance anyway.

It is not known how large a role Twain's own financial difficulties played in his decision to intervene in the publication of Grant's memoirs or in his suggestion that the former president use a publisher in which Twain was a significant investor. Notwithstanding the money Twain stood to make from the successful publication of Grant's memoirs, the final terms agreed upon were immensely favorable to the dying man: he or his heirs would receive 70% of all profits generated by subscriptions and sales of the memoir plus a $25,000 advance paid from Twain's own pocket. Over the two years following publication this percentage would generate more than $450,000 (equivalent to $ today) in royalties for Julia Grant.

Composition 

Twain moved in to Grant's New York City townhouse and remained literally at Grant's side while the dying man wrote up his life. Twain provided literary and copy editing at all stages of the book's composition, often offering advice on a page-by-page basis as he sat next to his furiously scribbling friend. Despite his worsening condition and the constant pain it produced, Grant wrote as a man possessed. During the evenings Twain would read all pages produced during that day and make suggestions to enhance consistency and tone. These evening readings often amounted to an astonishing fifty pages of draft, a pace that Grant maintained for more than four months.

Throughout his career Grant had repeatedly told highly detailed stories of his military experiences, sometimes making slight mistakes in terms of dates and locations. As a  hardscrabble farmer in St. Louis just before the war he had kept his neighbors spellbound until midnight while they "listen[ed] intently to his vivid narrations of Army experiences." In calm moments during the Civil War he often spoke of his recent experiences, typically "in terse and often eloquent language." Grant had told and retold his war stories so many times that writing his Memoirs was often simply a matter of repetition and polish instead of the more typical summarization of his recollections. This fact, as much as any reticence to discuss his childhood or presidency, may account for the Memoirs' overwhelming focus on the Mexican-American and Civil Wars.

Grant suffered greatly in his final year. He was in constant pain from his illness and sometimes had the feeling that he was choking. Despite his condition, he wrote at a furious pace, sometimes finishing 25 to 50 pages a day. The cancer spread through his body, so in June 1885 the family moved to a cottage in Mount MacGregor, New York, to make him more comfortable. He worked at finishing the book, propped up on chairs and too weak to walk. Friends, admirers, and even a few former Confederate opponents made their way to Mount MacGregor to pay their respects. Grant finished the manuscript on July 18; he died five days later.

Adam Badeau 

In the early stages of writing his Memoirs Grant had the assistance of Adam Badeau, an author who had served on his staff during the war. Badeau left before the project was complete, having disputed with Grant and his family concerning how much he would be paid and how he would be credited for his research, editing, and fact-checking. This led Badeau to initiate and spread the persistent rumor (before the book was even published) that Twain had ghostwritten Grant's memoirs. In actual fact the original manuscript is manifestly written in only one person's handwriting, that of Grant. Grant's son Frederick took over many of Badeau's fact-checking and research responsibilities after the author's departure in May 1885. Badeau eventually settled with Grant's heirs for $10,000 in the fall of 1888.

Structure

The Memoirs are divided into two volumes. The autobiography is unusual, but not unique, in that large sections of Grant's life such as his childhood and the presidency are given either brief mention or not discussed at all. The focus of the book is Grant's military career during the Mexican–American and Civil Wars.

Grant's writing has been praised for its conciseness and clarity—a sharp contrast from contemporary Civil War memoirs, which tended to reflect the Victorian fondness for elaborate language.

With regard to the Mexican–American War, Grant recorded his belief that it had been waged unjustly:

Generally, the officers of the army were indifferent whether the annexation was consummated or not; but not so all of them. For myself, I was bitterly opposed to the measure, and to this day regard the war, which resulted, as one of the most unjust ever waged by a stronger against a weaker nation. It was an instance of a republic following the bad example of European monarchies, in not considering justice in their desire to acquire additional territory.

His account of Lee's surrender at Appomattox Court House is particularly notable:

Grant also makes asides to clear up legends that had grown up around his leadership. After dismissing one tale, Grant wrote "Like many other stories, it would be very good if it were only true."

The narrative ends shortly after the Army of the Potomac's final review in Washington in May 1865. Grant deliberately avoids comment on Reconstruction, apart from saying that he favored black suffrage. The final chapter, "Conclusion," is a reflection on the war and its effects, the actions of foreign countries during it, and the reconciliation of North and South. In the final paragraphs, Grant makes note of his own condition and expresses optimism that "Federal and Confederate" can live together.

The work was published in a two-volume set after his death. Grant's printed signature followed the dedication: "These volumes are dedicated to the American Soldier and Sailor. / U. S. Grant / New York City / May 23rd, 1885." There are also numerous facsimile letters and correspondence bound into Volume II.

Legacy 

The press and public followed Grant's symptoms throughout his final year, and his work on the book was well known. While interest in his memoirs would have been high had Grant not been ill, his struggle to finish it before his death gave it even more attention.

On release, the book received universal critical praise. Twain compared the Memoirs to Julius Caesar's Commentaries. Matthew Arnold praised Grant and his book in an 1886 essay. Twain, however, felt Arnold's tone was condescending to both Grant and the United States, and the two authors feuded until Arnold's death in 1888. Gertrude Stein also admired the book, saying she could not think of Grant without weeping. The Memoirs quickly became a best seller.

Ulysses S. Grant sought to deliver his moral, political, economic and social argument for waging the war against the South in his Personal Memoirs. As the commander of the Union army and a two-term president, he had a unique perspective on the war that interested both the public and historical scholars, as they wanted to hear his side of the story. Although he was a clear figure in the public eye, Grant was unknown to many people. After the war, Grant's close colleague, General William T. Sherman remarked that, although he had known Grant for decades, "to me he is a mystery, and I believe he is a mystery to himself." In his Personal Memoirs, Grant portrayed himself as representative character of the North. In volume 1, he describes his family background and points to his simple upbringing as the reason for his solid, restrained virtues of a normal Northerner.

Grant goes to the point of declaring himself as "unmilitary" while continually stressing his simple nature. Grant stated that he did not even want to attend West Point, only going because his father thought it would be best, as Grant believed "a military life had no charms for me." Grant wrote of his participation in the Mexican War of 1846–1848, a war he did not support. Grant believed it was very unjust for the larger, stronger United States to pick on a weaker country as they were doing.

Grant used his Personal Memoirs as a way to respond to negative criticism immediately following the war, especially present in his description of the Battle of Shiloh. The two leading generals of the Union army at Shiloh were Grant and General Don Carlos Buell and they had very differing accounts of the battle. Many criticized Grant for being tremendously unprepared and Buell goes as far as to credit himself for the victory, while Grant proclaims the opposite story, stating the Union win was inevitable. Grant was able to use this book to portray his own personal memories of the events of the war and dispute any negative press he may have received.

Grant also used his Personal Memoirs to explain his battlefield action and his motives for the way he led. After the war, Grant was portrayed as a ruthless leader who stopped at nothing to make sure the South was destroyed. However, Grant felt this was a harsh evaluation and sought to improve the public opinion of himself and defend the fact he believed he was a simple and fair man. Grant felt he was being abused by newspaper coverage that he believed was shoddy, inaccurate and defeatist. He stated, "Up to the Battle of Shiloh, I, as well as thousands of other citizens, believed that the rebellion against the Government would collapse suddenly and soon, if decisive victory could be gained over any of its armies. … After Shiloh, I gave up all idea of saving the Union except by complete conquest. … The Northern troops were never more cruel than the necessities of war required."

Geoffrey Perret, the author of Ulysses S. Grant: Soldier and President staunchly disagreed with Grant's assertion that he was acting out of necessity and declared Grant's wartime conquests were against his Northern virtues. In Perret's eyes, Grant was "above all a soldier, and not a reluctant one." Perret argued that Grant in fact liked West Point, had few reservations at the time about the Mexican War and was a very good junior officer. Perret backs these accusations with the fact Grant, while appointed the General-in-Chief, "evolved the future of the United States Army" by applying "maximum firepower, maximum mobility" while relying on "the wide envelopment" as his principal form of maneuver.

Given over a century of favorable literary analysis, according to reviewer Mark Perry, the Memoirs are "the most significant work" of American non-fiction.

Mark Twain's opinion

Modern annotated edition 

On October 16, 2017, the first completely annotated edition of the memoirs was published by Harvard University Press. Executive Director of the Ulysses S. Grant Association John F. Marszalek, Associate Editor David S. Nolen, and Assistant Editor Louie P. Gallo completed the project in order to contextualize the memoirs for the modern reader.

See also
 Bibliography of Ulysses S. Grant § Primary sources
 Bibliography of the American Civil War

References
 Grant, Ulysses S. Personal Memoirs of U. S. Grant. New York: Charles L. Webster & Company, 1885–1886. .

Notes

External links

 
 Ulysses S. Grant: Friend Mark Twain Offers Terms for Publication of Memoirs– Shapell Manuscript Foundation

1885 non-fiction books
American Civil War memoirs
Books about Ulysses S. Grant
Books by Ulysses S. Grant
Books published posthumously
Mark Twain
Multi-volume biographies
Political memoirs
1886 non-fiction books
Books written by presidents of the United States